Jordan Lee (born June 30, 1991) is a professional bass fisherman from Cullman, Alabama.

Lee was the 2017 Bassmaster Classic Champion with a total weigh in of 56lbs -10oz and took the cash winnings of $300,000 (US). As of March 2017 he has had 14 top ten finishes in Bassmaster Professional Tournaments.

Lee attended Auburn University and placed third with teammate Shane Powell in the Carhartt Bassmaster College Championship in 2013.

Jordan Lee is sponsored by A.R.E. Truck Caps, Lowrance Electronics, T-H Marine, Berkley, Abu Garcia, Plano, Ranger Boats, Carhartt, Power-Pole, and Mossy Oak.

Like many other professionals on the Bassmaster tour, Lee has a series of videos on bass fishing.

On March 18 of 2018, Lee joined Rick Clunn and Kevin VanDam as the only fishermen to win consecutive Bassmaster Classics.

Career Stats 

 2 Bassmaster Classic Titles
 Career winnings: $1,123,429 (B.A.S.S.)
 Career Top Ten finishes: 21
 Total Tournaments	60
 Total Weight	2313lb - 13oz
 Classic Appearances	4

References

External links 
 https://www.bassmaster.com/anglers/kenneth-lee

1991 births
Living people